3C 305 is a Seyfert 2 radio galaxy located in the constellation Draco.

References

External links

Radio galaxies
Third Cambridge Survey 305
305
9553
Draco (constellation)
52924
+11-18-008
Seyfert galaxies